Ronald Jones (9 September 1938 – 30 April 2019) was an English cricketer who played a single game of first-class cricket, for Worcestershire against Cambridge University in 1955, in which he scored 2 and 23.

Notes

References

English cricketers
Worcestershire cricketers
1938 births
2019 deaths
Cricketers from Wolverhampton